Elseid Gëzim Hysaj (born 2 February 1994) is an Albanian professional footballer who plays as a right-back for Serie A club Lazio and the Albania national team, for which he is captain. Hysaj can operate on both sides of the pitch as a full-back.

Early life
Hysaj was born in Reç, Malësi e Madhe, Albania. Two months after Elseid's birth, his father Gëzim emigrated to Italy, like many Albanians had done in the 1990s, in search of employment opportunities in order to provide for his family. Elseid grew up in Shkodër with his mother and grandparents while his father worked in Italy as a bricklayer.

Hysaj himself started his youth career at age of 7 with KF Shkodra, an amateur club based in his birthplace Shkodër and managed by Taip Piraniqi. While working at the home of football agent Marco Piccioli, his father mentioned that his son was a talented footballer, however due to Elseid being only 10 years of age at the time, Piccioli advised Gëzim to wait. When Elseid had turned 14 he traveled to Italy where he was assessed by Piccioli and attended trials at various clubs, including Fiorentina before eventually joining the Empoli academy.

Club career

Empoli
Hysaj was first called for the Empoli senior squad for the 9th game week of the 2011–12 Serie B season against Varese on 9 October 2011, in which Hysaj was an unused substitute for the entire match. During the second half of the season, he was called-up twice more for matches in March and April but again remained as an unused substitute. He made his professional debut with the first team on 24 November 2011 in a Coppa Italia match against Fiorentina, playing the full 90-minutes in the 2–1 loss.

2012–13 season
Hysaj made his league debut on 20 October 2012 in the matchday 10 against Virtus Lanciano, which finished in a 0–3 away victory, where he came on as a 67th-minute substitute. Empoli eventually finished the 2012–13 season in 4th place and therefore qualified for the promotion playoffs. In semifinals they played against Novara, in where Hysaj played full 90-minutes in both legs, first on 22 May 2013, with the match finishing in a 1–1 away draw and in the second leg on 26 May 2013, which Empoli won 4–1.

Empoli then played in the two-legged final against Livorno. On 29 May 2013, Hysaj played another full 90-minutes in the first leg of the final against Livorno, finished in the draw 1–1 and another one in the second leg final on 2 June 2013, finished in the loss 1–0, At this way Livorno promoted to 2013–14 Serie A on aggregate 2–1. Hysaj finished 2012–13 season with Empoli, making a total of 35 appearances, by where 30 in league, 1 in Coppa Italia and 4 in Serie B promotion playoffs, offering one assistance. </ref> and in the second leg on 26 May 2013, which Empoli won 4–1.

2013–14 season
On 19 September 2013, he renewed his contract with Empoli until 2015.

Hysaj scored his first professional goal on 17 April 2014 in the match against Virtus Lanciano. The goal came in the 4th minute after he received a pass in the entrance area, made an zig-zag move between three opponents then issued a left-foot shoot, which was stopped at the gate of the squad triangle, but the strike was not enough, as Empoli loss the match within 2–1 result.

On 30 May 2014, Empoli ended their six-year absence from Serie A by earning promotion from Italy's Serie B.

2014–15 season
He made his Serie A debut on 31 August 2014 in the opening match against Udinese, which finished in a 2–0 defeat. Later on 31 October, Hysaj signed a new contract keeping him at the club until June 2017. His salary would also increase from €170,000 to €200,000.

Hysaj begun in the best way possible the year 2015, because after a goalless draw with his squad against Verona, he was selected by sports analysts in the best lineup of the 17th week of Serie A.

In his last season at Empoli, Hysaj played a total of 36 league games, including 33 as a starter. He appeared also in 3 Coppa Italia matches, where Empoli was eliminated in Round of 16 by Roma in extra-time.

Napoli
In July 2015, Hysaj concluded a deal with the fellow Serie A side Napoli, following former Empoli coach Maurizio Sarri and player Mirko Valdifiori to the club. On 3 August 2015, Hysaj completed his transfer at Napoli and signed on a five-year contract for a reported fee of €5 million, becoming the second most expensive move involving Albanian international players behind of Lorik Cana which currently holds the record with a €6.75 million move from Galatasaray to Lazio in July 2011.

2015–16 season
He made his competitive with the club on 23 August 2015 in the opening league match against Sassuolo, which finished in a 2–1 away defeat. He showed an impressive form at the club to become a regular starter under the coach Maurizio Sarri and also playing the entire 90-minute matches, substituting off in just a few cases and leaving behind the Italian international Christian Maggio.

Hysaj made his European debut on 17 September 2015 in the Europa League group stage match against Club Brugge, which ended in a 5–0 home win. Napoli finished the Group D in the first place by winning all matches, and was drawn to play Villarreal in the Round of 32.

On 8 February 2016 Hysaj was included in the best 11 of Serie A youth players by football analyst Gianluca Di Marzio among big names such as Juventus players, Paul Pogba, Paulo Dybala, Inter Milan player Mauro Icardi and Milan player M'Baye Niang. Calciomercato selected Hysaj as the best right-back in Serie A.

2016–17 season
He was ranked third at Napoli for most minutes played during the entire season including all competitions. In the end of the season his value went €18 million becoming the most valuable player of Albania national team.

2017–18 season
Hysaj made his 100th appearance in all competitions for Napoli on 21 October 2017 in the goalless home draw against Internazionale valid for the matchday 9 of 2017–18 Serie A.

2018–19 season
Chelsea made a bid for Hysaj in the summer of 2018 for £43 million.
However, Hysaj's agent valued him at €60 million. Hysaj was considered at the time one of the best players in his position in the world.

2019–20 season
In the 2019–20 season, Hysaj scored his first goal for Napoli against Sassuolo on 25 July 2020.

International career

Youth teams

Hysaj played three matches with under-17 side valids for the qualifying round of 2011 UEFA European Under-17 Championship; on 25 September 2010 against Norway lost by 2–0, Republic of Ireland on 27 September 2010 also lost by 2–0 and against Malta on 30 September 2010 drawn by 1–1.

In an interview for Albanian media, Hysaj declared that he was invited once by Italian Football Federation but he has refused as he wanted to representing Albania at international level.

After his performances with the senior team, he moved back temporarily to the under-21 team, when he was called up for a friendly match against Austria on 14 August 2013.

After a game against Belarus, three days later he played once more with under-21 against Spain, match valid for qualifying round of 2015 UEFA European Under-21 Football Championship where they lost 2–0. On 5 March 2014, he played in last match valid for qualification to the 2015 UEFA European Under-21 Championship against Austria, finished in a 3–1 away victory.

Senior side
Following his good performances with Empoli in Serie B and some consults of assistant coach of the Albania national team, Paolo Tramezzani, the Albania's head coach Gianni De Biasi decided to invite Hysaj for the friendly match against Georgia on 6 February 2013.

In this game, at the age of 18, he made his debut, becoming the third youngest player after Blendi Nallbani and Iljaz Çeço to play for the Albania national team.

He made his first competitive debut for Albania on 22 March 2013 in the 2014 FIFA World Cup qualifying match against Norway coming on as a substitute in the 80th minute in place of Armend Dallku, match finished in an important away 1–0 victory. He played also in the next match against Norway on 7 June 2013 as a substitute in place of Ervin Bulku in the last moments of the 1–1 draw. Hysaj was called up to the squad for the double-away matches against Slovenia and Iceland on 6 and 10 September 2013. Hysaj was an unused substitute against Slovenia on 6 September 2013, match finished in the 1–0 loss.

He was called up for the senior team once again for a friendly match against Belarus on 15 November 2013.

Euro 2016

On 21 May 2016, Hysaj was named in Albania's preliminary 27-man squad for UEFA Euro 2016, and in Albania's final 23-man UEFA Euro squad on 31 May. On 28 May, he captained his side for the first time during the Euro 2016 warm-up match against Qatar, which ended in a 3–1 win, becoming the youngest ever captain.

Hysaj played every minute of all Group A matches as Albania were eliminated by ranking in the 3rd place behind hosts France against which they lost 2–0 and Switzerland against which they also lost 1–0 in the opening match and ahead of Romania by beating them 1–0 in the closing match with a goal by Armando Sadiku. Albania finished the group in the third position with three points and with a goal difference −2, and was ranked last in the third-placed teams, which eventually eliminated them. He was part of the list for the candidates to win award as the best young player of the tournament, rated for his extraordinary ability in attack and defence, involvement in decisive action in attack and defence, tactical maturity and efficiency during appearances in the match and a fair-play attitude during the tournament.

2018 FIFA World Cup qualification
Hysaj retained his starting place in the Albania's 2018 FIFA World Cup qualification campaign playing three first matches as the full 90-minutes. Albania collected all six possible points in their first two matches, beating Macedonia 2–1 in the opening match on 5 September 2016 and later Liechtenstein 2–0 away on 6 October. In the next game against Spain on 10 October, Albania lost 2–0. On 12 November 2016, in the home game against Israel, Albania suffered a 3–0 loss with the first goal scored by penalty kick conceded by Albanian defender Berat Djimsiti in the 16th minute followed also by a red card and two other goals scored in the second-half after Albania remained now with nine players following another Red card received by Etrit Berisha in the 55th minute after a physical clash against Israeli striker Eran Zahavi, ultimately knocking him down with a headbutt. Hysaj was substituted off in the 79th minute for striker Edgar Çani as coach Gianni De Biasi placed a trio forwarding line to attempt to score.

Personal life
On 9 June 2015, Hysaj got engaged with Miss Albania 2013 Fiorenza Lekstakaj. They married in June 2019. He is also a supporter of Socialist Party of Albania, having taken part in 2017 electoral campaign in Shkodër.

Career statistics

Club

International

Scores and results list Albania's goal tally first, score column indicates score after each Hysaj goal.

Honours
Empoli
Serie B runner-up: 2013–14

Napoli
 Coppa Italia: 2019–20
Serie A runner-up: 2015–16, 2017–18, 2018–19

References

External links

 
 
 
 Elseid Hysaj profile at FSHF.org (part 1)
 Elseid Hysaj profile at FSHF.org (part 2)

1994 births
Living people
People from Malësi e Madhe
Association football fullbacks
Albanian footballers
Albania youth international footballers
Albania under-21 international footballers
Albania international footballers
UEFA Euro 2016 players
Empoli F.C. players
S.S.C. Napoli players
S.S. Lazio players
Serie A players
Serie B players
Albanian expatriate footballers
Albanian expatriate sportspeople in Italy
Expatriate footballers in Italy